Ferozi Football Club (formerly known as Kabul Bank FC) is a football club based in Afghanistan. They compete in the Kabul Premier League (KPL), and have previously played the Afghan Premier League.

Last registered squad

Achievements
Kabul Premier League
Runners-up (2): 2007, 2013
Afghanistan National Unity Cup
Runners-up (1): 2008
Kabul Cup
Champions (1): 2013

They earned the best team In Afghanistan award

References

External links

Football clubs in Afghanistan
Sport in Kabul